Inkwil is a municipality in the Oberaargau administrative district in the canton of Bern in Switzerland.

History
Inkwil is first mentioned in 1262 as Inchwile.

Geography
Of this area,  or 49.1% is used for agricultural purposes, while  or 36.0% is forested.

Of the built up area, housing and buildings made up 7.1% and transportation infrastructure made up 5.7%.  35.1% of the total land area is heavily forested.  Of the agricultural land, 37.5% is used for growing crops and 8.9% is pastures, while 2.7% is used for orchards or vine crops.  All the water in the municipality is in lakes.

It is divided into three sections; Dorf, Vorstatt and Station.

Demographics
, 4.0% of the population was made up of foreign nationals. Over the last 10 years the population has decreased at a rate of -2.4%. Most of the population speaks German  (98.0%), with Portuguese being second most common ( 0.5%) and Serbo-Croatian being third ( 0.5%).

In the 2007 election the most popular party was the SVP which received 36.8% of the vote.  The next three most popular parties were the SPS (29.8%), the FDP (13.7%) and the CSP (5.4%).

The age distribution of the population is children and teenagers (0–19 years old) make up 26.6% of the population, while adults (20–64 years old) make up 58.4% and seniors (over 64 years old) make up 15%.  About 82.2% of the population (between age 25-64) have completed either non-mandatory upper secondary education or additional higher education (either university or a Fachhochschule).

Inkwil has an unemployment rate of 1.64%.  , there were 20 people employed in the primary economic sector and about 8 businesses involved in this sector.  69 people are employed in the secondary sector and there are 6 businesses in this sector.  20 people are employed in the tertiary sector, with 10 businesses in this sector.
The historical population is given in the following table:

Heritage sites of national significance
It is home to the Inkwilersee Insel prehistoric pile-dwelling (or stilt house) settlements that are part of the Prehistoric Pile dwellings around the Alps UNESCO World Heritage Site.

References

External links

Municipalities of the canton of Bern